The 2005 St Peter Port South by-election was held in the States of Guernsey district of St Peter Port South on 21 September 2005 following the death of deputy Michael Burbridge in June 2005. The deadline for nominations was 26 August.

There were eight candidates, Roy Bisson, Michael Bourgaize, Barry Cash, Gloria Dudley-Owen, Jan Kuttlewascher, Peter Leigh, Angus Perfitt, and Jenny Tasker. Perfitt withdrew in early September before the election, however, his name remained on the ballot. Tasker won with 306 votes.

Result

References

By-elections in Guernsey
St Peter Port South by-election
St Peter Port South by-election
St Peter Port South by-election